Ove-Erik Tronvoll (born 21 September 1972) is a Norwegian ski mountaineer and cross-country skier.

Cross-country skiing results
All results are sourced from the International Ski Federation (FIS).

World Cup

Season standings

Selected results 
 2007:
 8th, European Championship relay race (together with Ola Berger, Martin Bartnes and Ola Herje Hovdenak)
 2008:
 7th, World Championship relay race (together with Ola Berger, Ola Herje Hovdenak and Ole-Jakob Sande)
 9th, World Championship team race (together with Ola Berger)
 2009:
 7th, European Championship relay race (together with Ola Berger, Ola Herje Hovdenak and Rolv Eriksrud)
 2010:
 7th, World Championship relay race (together with Ola Herje Hovdenak, Ola Berger and Per Gustav Porsanger)
 2011:
 8th, World Championship relay, together with Ola Herje Hovdenak, Ola Berger and Thomas Oyberg
 2012:
 6th, European Championship relay, together with Ola Berger, Ola Herje Hovdenak and Olav Tronvoll

External links 
 Ove-Erik Tronvoll at skimountaineering.org

References 

1972 births
Living people
Norwegian male ski mountaineers
Norwegian male cross-country skiers